The 1984 Florida Citrus Bowl was a college football postseason bowl game that featured the Georgia Bulldogs and the Florida State Seminoles.

Background
A 7–1 start and a #8 ranking came crashing down after a loss to Florida in the World's Largest Outdoor Cocktail Party rivalry game, as they then lost to #15 Auburn and Georgia Tech to crater into the Citrus Bowl without a ranking, and a (tied for) 3rd-place finish in the Southeastern Conference. A 4–0 start (and a #6 ranking) for the Seminoles ended with a 3–3–1 finish. This was Georgia's first Florida Citrus Bowl since 1974, along with their 5th straight bowl appearance. This was Florida State's first Florida Citrus Bowl since 1977 and 3rd straight bowl appearance.

Game summary
 Georgia – Lars Tate 4-yard touchdown run (Butler kick), 5:26 remaining in 2nd quarter
 Georgia – Lars Tate 2-yard touchdown run (Butler kick), 1:08 remaining in 2nd quarter
 Florida State – Schmidt 32-yard field goal, 10:26 remaining in 3rd quarter
 Florida State – Smith 1-yard touchdown run (run failed), 14:21 remaining in 4th quarter 
 Georgia – Kevin Butler 36-yard field goal, 12:10 remaining in 4th quarter
 Florida State – Joe Wessel 14-yard touchdown return of blocked punt (Darrin Holloman run), 3:58 remaining in 4th quarter
Jackson threw 7-of-16 for 159 yards in an MVP effort.

Aftermath
Florida State has not returned to the Citrus Bowl since this game, while Georgia returned in 1993, 2004, 2009 and 2013.

Statistics

References

Florida Citrus Bowl
Citrus Bowl (game)
Florida State Seminoles football bowl games
Georgia Bulldogs football bowl games
Florida Citrus Bowl
Florida Citrus Bowl